jrMan renderer is an open-source version of the Reyes rendering  algorithm used by Pixar's PhotoRealistic RenderMan, implemented in Java by Gerardo Horvilleur, Jorge Vargas, Elmer Garduno and Alessandro Falappa.

jrMan is available under the GNU General Public License (GPL)

Current version 

Release 0.4

Features 

Shadows, texture mapping, surface shaders, light shaders, volume shaders, displacement shaders, all pixel filters, generate image to file (RGB & RGBA), delayed Read Archive.

Supported primitives 

Sphere, Torus, Cone, Disk, Cylinder, Paraboloid, Hyperboloid, Points, Patch "bilinear" and "bicubic" (all basis & rational), Polygon, PointsPolygon, ObjectInstance, PatchMesh, NuPatch, Curves "linear" and "cubic" (also rational).

Features not yet implemented 

Shading language compiler, Motion blur, Depth of field, Level of detail, CSG, Trim curves, Subdivision surfaces, General Polygons.

See also 

RenderMan Interface Specification

External links
jrMan homepage

Free 3D graphics software
Free software programmed in Java (programming language)